Senator McGrew may refer to:

James McGrew (Kansas politician) (1822–1911), Kansas State Senate
Joseph McGrew (1829–1897), Wisconsin State Senate